Thomas Kempe was a medieval Bishop of London.

Kempe was the nephew of John Kemp, Archbishop of Canterbury.

Kempe was provided to London on 21 August 1448 and consecrated on 8 February 1450. He died on 28 March 1489. He had previously held the offices of Archdeacon of York and then Richmond from 1442 to 1448.

There was a memorial to him by the tenth column at the west end of Old St Paul's Cathedral.

Citations

References

External links
 Will of Thomas Kempe
 

Bishops of London
1489 deaths
Archdeacons of Richmond
Year of birth unknown